Grahamsville may refer to:

Grahamsville, New York, a hamlet in Sullivan County
Grahamsville Historic District, in Sullivan County, New York

See also
Grahamville (disambiguation)